Die Gesellschaft (German: Society) was a magazine which was published in German Empire between 1885 and 1902. It billed itself as the "organ of contemporary literary youth". It is known for its strong support for naturalism and its founder and editor Michael Georg Conrad.

History and profile
Die Gesellschaft was established by Michael Georg Conrad in Munich in 1885. Conrad and Karl Bleibtreu edited the magazine until 1902 when it folded. The magazine came out weekly between its start in 1885 and 1891. Then it was published on a monthly basis. The first two volumes of the magazine were published by Conrad. From 1887 its publisher became the Friedrich Verlag which was owned by Wilhelm Friedrich and based in Leipzig. Die Gesellschaft ceased publication in 1902 after producing 18 issues.

Content and contributors
Die Gesellschaft provided articles on naturalism, literature, art and public life. One of its contributors was the German Georgist Michael Flürscheim who wrote about the program of the Land League. Another one was Anna Croissant-Rust who published short fictional proses following naturalist literary approach. Alfred Schuler was also among the contributors of the magazine.

References

External links

1885 establishments in Germany
1902 disestablishments in Germany
Defunct literary magazines published in Germany
German-language magazines
Magazines established in 1885
Magazines disestablished in 1902
Magazines published in Leipzig
Magazines published in Munich
Naturalism (literature)
Monthly magazines published in Germany
Weekly magazines published in Germany